Liu Xi (fl. 319 CE) was a Chinese nobleman and prince from Han Zhao. The son of Former Zhao emperor Liu Yao and his wife Yang Xianrong, he was created Prince of Changle in 319.

History
Liu Xi was the son Liu Yao, Emperor of Former Zhao, and of Empress Xianwen. He was similarly named to his brother Liu Xi, albeit with a different second character/ tone on his name's second syllable. In 319, his mother was established as Empress, his nearly-namesake brother Liu Xi established as crown prince, his brother Liu Chan created as Prince of Taiyuan, and he as Prince of Changle.

Former Zhao ended in 329, and his brother the crown prince Liu Xi was defeated and killed.

References

4th-century Chinese people
Chinese princes
Former Zhao people
Xiongnu